Long Trail School is an independent college-preparatory coeducational day school serving students in grades 6-12 located in Dorset, Vermont, United States. The school provides financial aid to qualified students. Many area students are eligible for some amount of tax-funded tuition assistance.

History 
David Wilson, founded Long Trail School in 1975 with an original class of 14 students in the rented space of the Dorset Sportsman’s Club.

The school, which serves grades 6-12, has consistently grown, with 200 students enrolled for the 2019-20 academic year.

Notable changes over the years have included the acquisition and construction the  facility with winding hallways and small classrooms, two common rooms, offices, a library, a 220-seat theater, art studios, presentation spaces, and a gymnasium. In 2019 a new building was opened entitled "The Field House". It is an athletics center.

About the school 
Long Trail School has drawn students from over 38 towns in Vermont and neighboring New York state, and from 20 foreign countries.

As of May 14, 2010, Long Trail School is the first school in Vermont to be officially inducted as an International Baccalaureate school.

Academics
Class sizes currently average 8-12 students, though classes with only a single student are not unheard of at Long Trail. Academic standards are high by comparison to other local schools, with test scores consistently above state and local averages. Even after offering IB courses, Long Trail continues to offer some Advanced Placement classes, many independent study opportunities and student-demanded classes.

The arts
Long Trail offers musical, visual, and theatrical arts.

Athletics
Long Trail offers athletic teams for middle and upper school students in soccer, cross-country, golf, basketball, dance rock climbing, track and field and ultimate frisbee.

In 2004, Long Trail made the transition to Division IV varsity athletics.

LTSummer 
LTSummer is a day camp held by Long Trail School every summer. The camp is divided into several programs for different age groups.

References

External links
 

Private high schools in Vermont
Preparatory schools in Vermont
Buildings and structures in Dorset, Vermont
Schools in Bennington County, Vermont
Private middle schools in Vermont
Educational institutions established in 1975
International Baccalaureate schools in Vermont